This list of archaeological sites in Nairnshire comprises archaeological discoveries in Nairnshire providing context in relation to the dominant Royal Burgh of Nairn, Scotland.

Archaeological sites in Nairnshire
 
 
Places in Scotland